Allan Park is a park in Charleston, South Carolina. The parcel of land was donated to the City of Charleston by Amey Allan, the widow of James Allan and the developer of most of the eastern half of Hampton Park Terrace parks on the peninsula, on March 23, 1920. The park is lined with oak trees which replaced the palmetto trees in the original plans.

Allan Park began being used more frequently in the 1990s and the nearby neighborhood encouraged the replacement of the fountain in Allan Park. The new fountain was installed in 2000 but it had a myriad of issues and sat idle for two years until it was repaired and modified in 2004.

Notes

Parks in Charleston, South Carolina